Brachyopa scutellaris  is a European species of hoverfly.

Description
External images
For terms see Morphology of Diptera
The wing length is 6·5-7·75 mm. Apical antennomere with a large kidney-shaped sensory pit 
Tergite 2 posterolaterally black pilose. The larva is illustrated by Rotheray (1993).

Distribution
Brachyopa scutellaris is a west Palearctic species with a distribution centred in Europe (Denmark to the Pyrenees, Ireland east through Central Europe to Switzerland).

Habitat and biology
The habitat is deciduous forest (Acer, Alnus, Ulmus, Fraxinus). The flight period is mid April to end June. Brachyopa scutellaris flies, pendulously, in sunlit patches beside living trees with sap runs (where the larvae develop) and around rot-holes. Flowers visited include white umbellifers, Cardamine, Crataegus, Malus, Cornus, Photinia, Rubus fruticosus, Sorbus and  Viburnum.

References

External links
 Biolib

Eristalinae
Insects described in 1843
Diptera of Europe
Taxa named by Jean-Baptiste Robineau-Desvoidy